Pablo Leopoldo Arreola Ortega (born 15 November 1958) is a Mexican politician from the Labor Party. From 2006 to 2009 he served as Deputy of the LX Legislature of the Mexican Congress representing the Federal District.

References

1958 births
Living people
Politicians from Mexico City
Labor Party (Mexico) politicians
21st-century Mexican politicians
Instituto Politécnico Nacional alumni
Members of the Congress of Zacatecas
Deputies of the LX Legislature of Mexico
Members of the Chamber of Deputies (Mexico) for Mexico City